Vieri Tosatti (born Rome, 1920 - died there, 1999) was an Italian composer.  He is best known for his operas, among them Il sistema della dolcezza (1948), after Edgar Allan Poe's "The System of Doctor Tarr and Professor Fether", and Partita a pugni (1953), about a boxing match.  His output also includes chamber music, as well as some symphonic and choral works.  He studied at the Accademia Nazionale di Santa Cecilia under Ildebrando Pizzetti.

References
Obituary in the Corriere della sera (in Italian)
Biography and Catalog (in Italian)
Biography at Treccani.it (in Italian)

Italian classical composers
Italian male classical composers
Italian opera composers
Male opera composers
Musicians from Rome
Accademia Nazionale di Santa Cecilia alumni
1920 births
1999 deaths
20th-century classical composers
20th-century Italian composers
20th-century Italian male musicians
Burials at the Cimitero Flaminio